The Bharat Ratna (Jewel of India) is the highest civilian award of the Republic of India. Instituted on 2 January 1954, the award is conferred in recognition of "exceptional service/performance of the highest order", without distinction of race, occupation, position, or sex. The award was originally limited to achievements in the arts, literature, science, and public services, but the government expanded the criteria to include "any field of human endeavour" in December 2011. The recommendations for the Bharat Ratna are made by the Prime Minister to the President, with a maximum of three nominees being awarded per year. The recipients receive a Sanad (certificate) signed by the President and a peepal leaf-shaped medallion. There is no monetary grant associated with the award. Bharat Ratna recipients rank seventh in the Indian order of precedence.

The first recipients of the Bharat Ratna were: the last Governor-General of the Dominion of India and the former Chief Minister of Tamil Nadu – C. Rajagopalachari, second President and the first Vice President of India – Sarvepalli Radhakrishnan and Nobel Prize Laureate and Physicist C. V. Raman; who were honoured in 1954. Since then, the award has been bestowed upon 48 individuals, including 14 who were awarded posthumously. The original statutes did not provide for posthumous awards but were amended in January 1955 to permit them. Former Prime Minister Lal Bahadur Shastri became the first individual to be honoured posthumously. In 2014, cricketer Sachin Tendulkar, then aged 40, became the youngest recipient; while social reformer Dhondo Keshav Karve was awarded on his 100th birthday. The first singer to be awarded was M. S. Subbulakshmi and the first actor to be awarded was M. G. Ramachandran. Though usually conferred on India-born citizens, the Bharat Ratna has been awarded to one naturalized citizen – Mother Teresa, and to two non-Indians: Abdul Ghaffar Khan (born in British India and later citizen of Pakistan) and Nelson Mandela, born in and citizen of South Africa. On 25 January 2019, the government announced the award to social activist Nanaji Deshmukh (posthumously), singer-music director Bhupen Hazarika (posthumously) and to the former President of India, Pranab Mukherjee.

The Bharat Ratna, along with other personal civil honours, was briefly suspended from July 1977 to January 1980, during the change in the national government; and for a second time from August 1992 to December 1995, when several public-interest litigations challenged the constitutional validity of the awards. In 1992, the government's decision to confer the award posthumously on Subhas Chandra Bose was opposed by those who had refused to accept the fact of his death, including some members of his extended family. Following a 1997 Supreme Court decision, the press communiqué announcing Bose's award was cancelled; it is the only time when the award was announced but not conferred.

The bestowals of the posthumous awards of Sardar Vallabhbhai Patel (1991) and Madan Mohan Malaviya (2015) drew criticism, because they died before the award was instituted.

History
On 2 January 1954, a press communique was released from the office of the secretary to the President announcing the creation of two civilian awards—Bharat Ratna, the highest civilian award, and the three-tier Padma Vibhushan, classified into "Pahela Warg" (Class I), "Dusra Warg" (Class II), and "Tisra Warg" (Class III), which rank below the Bharat Ratna. On 15 January 1955, the Padma Vibhushan was reclassified into three different awards; the Padma Vibhushan, the highest of the three, followed by the Padma Bhushan and the Padma Shri.

There is no formal provision that recipients of the Bharat Ratna should be Indian citizens. It has been awarded to a naturalised Indian citizen, Mother Teresa in 1980, and to two non-Indians, Abdul Ghaffar Khan of Pakistan in 1987 and the former South African president Nelson Mandela in 1990. M. S. Subbulakshmi from Tamil Nadu became the first musician to receive the honour. Sachin Tendulkar, at the age of 40, became the youngest person and first sportsperson to receive the honour. In a special ceremony on 18 April 1958, Dhondo Keshav Karve was awarded on his 100th birthday. , the award has been conferred upon 48 people with 14 posthumous declarations.

The award was briefly suspended twice in its history. The first suspension occurred after Morarji Desai was sworn in as the fourth Prime Minister in 1977. His government withdrew all personal civil honours on 13 July 1977. The suspension was rescinded on 25 January 1980, after Indira Gandhi became the Prime Minister. The civilian awards were suspended again in mid-1992, when two Public-Interest Litigations were filed, one in the Kerala High Court and another in the Madhya Pradesh High Court, challenging the "constitutional validity" of the awards. The awards were reintroduced by the Supreme Court in December 1995, following the conclusion of the litigation.

Regulations
The Bharat Ratna is conferred "in recognition of exceptional service/performance of the highest order", without distinction of race, occupation, position, or sex. The award was originally confined to the arts, literature, science, and public services, as per the 1954 regulations. In December 2011, the rules were changed to include "any field of human endeavour". The 1954 statutes did not allow posthumous awards, but this was subsequently modified in the January 1955 statute, and Lal Bahadur Shastri became the first recipient to be honoured posthumously in 1966.

Although there is no formal nomination process, recommendations for the award can only be made by the Prime Minister to the President with a maximum number of three nominees being awarded per year. However, in 1999, four individuals were awarded the honour. The recipient receives a Sanad (certificate) signed by the President and a medallion without any monetary grant. Usage of the title 'Bharat Ratna' as a prefix by the awardee is exempt from Article 18 (1) of the Constitution, as per the Supreme Court's precedent in Balaji Raghavan/S.P. Anand v. Union of India in 1995. Additionally, recipients may either use the expression "Awarded Bharat Ratna by the President" or "Recipient of Bharat Ratna Award" to indicate that they have been honoured with the award. The holders of the Bharat Ratna rank seventh in the Indian order of precedence.

As with many official announcements, recipients are announced and registered in The Gazette of India, a publication released by the Department of Publication, Ministry of Urban Development used for official government notices; without publication in the Gazette, conferral of the award is not considered official. Recipients whose awards have been revoked or restored, both of which require the authority of the President, are registered in the Gazette. Recipients whose awards have been revoked are required to surrender their medals, and their names are struck from the register.

Specifications

The original 1954 specifications of the award was a circle made of gold  in diameter with a centred sun burst design on the obverse side. The text "Bharat Ratna", in Devanagari Script, is inscribed on the upper edge in silver gilt with a wreath set along on the lower edge. A platinum State Emblem of India was placed in the center of the reverse side with the national motto, "Satyameva Jayate" in Devanagari Script (lit. "Truth alone triumphs"), inscribed in silver-gilt on the lower edge.

A year later, the design was modified. The words "Bharat Ratna" on the obverse side remained the same as the 1954 design as did the emblem of India and "Satyameva Jayate" on the reverse side. A  white ribbon is attached to the medal so it can be worn around the neck. In 1957, the silver-gilt decoration was changed to burnished bronze. The Bharat Ratna medals are produced at Alipore Mint, Kolkata along with the other civilian and military awards like Padma Vibushan, Padma Bhushan, Padma Shri, and Param Veer Chakra.

Entitlements 
Bharat Ratna can not be used as a prefix or suffix, however recipients may identify themselves as "Awarded Bharat Ratna by the President" or "Recipient of Bharat Ratna Award". The award does not carry any monetary benefits, however there several special entitlements which include:

 The medallion and miniature
 A Sanad (certificate) signed by the President of India.
 Treatment as a state guests by state governments when traveling within a state.
 Indian missions abroad requested to facilitate recipients when requested.
 Entitlement to a diplomatic passport. 
 Lifetime free executive class travel on Air India. 
 Placed seventh in the Indian order of precedence.

Controversies
 
The Bharat Ratna has been mired in several controversies and award grants have been subject to multiple Public-Interest Litigations (PILs).

Prime ministers of India 
Jawaharlal Nehru has been incorrectly criticised for awarding Bharat Ratna to himself while serving as Prime Minister of India in 1955. This false claim has been debunked as the then President of India, Rajendra Prasad himself confessed that he conferred this award to Nehru, "unconstitutionally, without any recommendation or advice from the Prime Minister or the Cabinet", for Nehru's successful visit of the European countries and the Soviet Union (a visit aimed for the promotion of peace as the Cold War was rapidly escalating) and Nehru's efforts to establish India as a major player in world affairs, which found popular support outside India.

Similar claims have been made with regards to Nehru's daughter Indira Gandhi who succeeded him as the third Prime Minister of India. These accusation also proved to be factually incorrect as the then President of India, V. V. Giri conferred this award to Indira Gandhi for steering India to victory in the 14-day-long 1971 war with Pakistan over East Pakistan (now Bangladesh). President V. V. Giri took full responsibility for conferring the honour to Indira.

However, Rajiv Gandhi was awarded Bharat Ratna, without any controversy, posthumously after he was assassinated by LTTE in 1991. It was a unanimous decision of the ruling party and the opposition.

Subhas Chandra Bose (1992) 

On 23 January 1992, a press release was published by the President's Secretariat to confer the award posthumously on Subhas Chandra Bose. The decision triggered much criticism and a PIL was filed in the Calcutta High Court to revoke the award. The petitioner took objection to the conferral of the award and its posthumous mention of Bose, saying that honouring a personality higher than the award is "ridiculous", and it was an act of "carelessness" to classify such a person with past and future recipients. It said that the award cannot be conferred to Bose posthumously as the Government had not officially accepted his death on 18 August 1945. The petitioner requested the whereabouts of Bose from 18 August 1945 to date, based on the information collected by the 1956 Shah Nawaz Committee and the 1970 Khosla Commission. Bose's family members expressed their unwillingness to accept the award.

To deliver the judgement, the Supreme Court formed a Special Division Bench with Judge Sujata V. Manohar and G. B. Pattanaik. The Solicitor General noted that to confer the award per the appropriate regulations pertaining to the Bharat Ratna, Padma Vibhushan, Padma Bhushan, and Padma Shri, the name of the recipient must be published in The Gazette of India and entered in the recipients register maintained under the direction of the President. It was noted that only an announcement had been made by press communiqué, but the government had not proceeded to confer the award by publishing the name in the Gazette and entering the name in the register. Furthermore, the then presidents, Ramaswamy Venkataraman (1987–92) and Shankar Dayal Sharma (1992–97), had not conferred a Sanad (certificate) with their signature and seal.

On 4 August 1997, the Supreme Court delivered an order that since the award had not been officially conferred, it cannot be revoked and declared that the press communiqué be treated as cancelled. The court declined to pass any judgement on the posthumous mention of Bose and his death.

Civilian awards as "Titles" (1992) 
In 1992, two PILs were filed in the High Courts; one in the Kerala High Court on 13 February 1992 by Balaji Raghavan and another in the Madhya Pradesh High Court (Indore Bench) on 24 August 1992 by Satya Pal Anand. Both petitioners questioned the civilian awards being "Titles" per an interpretation of Article 18 (1) of the Constitution. On 25 August 1992, the Madhya Pradesh High Court issued a notice temporarily suspending all civilian awards. A Special Division Bench of the Supreme Court was formed comprising five judges; A. M. Ahmadi C. J., Kuldip Singh, B. P. Jeevan Reddy, N. P. Singh, and S. Saghir Ahmad. On 15 December 1995, the Special Division Bench restored the awards and delivered a judgement that the "Bharat Ratna and Padma awards are not titles under Article 18 of the Constitution".

C. N. R. Rao and Sachin Tendulkar (2013) 

Following the announcement, in November 2013, that C. N. R. Rao and Sachin Tendulkar were to be awarded the Bharat Ratna, multiple PILs were filed challenging the conferring of the award. The PIL filed against Rao declared that other Indian scientists, such as Homi Bhabha and Vikram Sarabhai, had contributed more than Rao and his claim of publishing 1400 research papers was "physically impossible". The suit stated that as Rao had proven cases of plagiarism, he should not be presented with the award but rather should be annulled. The PIL filed against Tendulkar to the Election Commission under the Right to Information Act indicated that the awarding him the Bharat Ratna was a violation of the model code of conduct. The petitioner noted that as Tendulkar was an Indian National Congress nominated Member of Rajya Sabha, the decision to award him the Bharat Ratna would influence the voters of Delhi, Rajasthan, Madhya Pradesh, Chhattisgarh, and Mizoram where the election process was underway at the time. Another PIL was filed against Tendulkar and a few ministers, alleging an apparent "conspiracy to ignore" the famed Indian field hockey player Dhyan Chand.

On 4 December 2013, the Election Commission rejected the petition stating that conferring the award on people from non-polling states did not amount to a violation of the code. Other High Courts as well rejected the petitions raised against Rao and Tendulkar.

Criticism
In 1988, then Prime Minister Rajiv Gandhi (1984–89) conferred the Bharat Ratna posthumously on movie actor and former Chief Minister of Tamil Nadu, M. G. Ramachandran, in a bid to influence voters prior to the Tamil Nadu assembly elections in 1989. The decision was criticised for awarding Ramachandran before independence activists B. R. Ambedkar and Vallabhbhai Patel, who were bestowed the honour in 1990 and 1991, respectively. While Ravi Shankar was accused of lobbying for the award, the decision by Indira Gandhi to posthumously honour K. Kamaraj was considered to have been aimed at placating Tamil voters for the Tamil Nadu assembly elections in 1977. The seventh Prime Minister Vishwanath Pratap Singh was criticised for posthumously honouring B. R. Ambedkar to please the Dalits.

The posthumous conferments of the award on the recipients who died before the Indian independence in 1947 or the award was instituted in 1954 have been criticised by historians. It was noted that such conferments could lead to more demands to honour people like Maurya Emperor Ashoka, Mughal Emperor Akbar, Maratha Emperor Shivaji, Nobel Laureate Rabindranath Tagore, Hindu spiritualist Swami Vivekananda, and independence activist Bal Gangadhar Tilak. The then Prime Minister P. V. Narasimha Rao (1991–96) was criticised for bestowing the award upon Vallabhbhai Patel in 1991, 41 years after his death in 1950; and upon Subhas Chandra Bose in 1992, who died in 1945. In 2015, the Prime Minister Narendra Modi's decision to award Madan Mohan Malaviya, who died in 1946, close to the elections in Uttar Pradesh met with criticism.

A few of the conferments have been criticised for honouring personalities only after they received global recognition. The award for Mother Teresa was announced in 1980, a year after she was awarded the Nobel Peace Prize. Satyajit Ray received an Academy Honorary Award in 1992 followed by the Bharat Ratna the same year. In 1999, Amartya Sen was awarded the Bharat Ratna, a year after his 1998 Nobel Memorial Prize in Economic Sciences. The award was proposed by Prime Minister Atal Bihari Vajpayee to President K. R. Narayanan who agreed to the proposal.

Popular demands

Though, as per the statutes for the Bharat Ratna, the recommendations for the award can only be made by the Prime Minister to the President, there have been several demands from various political parties to honour their leaders. In January 2008, Bharatiya Janata Party (BJP) leader L. K. Advani wrote to the Prime Minister Manmohan Singh recommending Singh's predecessor Atal Bihari Vajpayee for the award. This was immediately followed by the Communist Party of India (Marxist) lobbying for their leader, Jyoti Basu, former Chief Minister of West Bengal. Basu, India's longest-serving chief minister at that time, said that he would decline the honour, even if awarded. Similar demands were made by Telugu Desam Party, Bahujan Samaj Party, and Shiromani Akali Dal for their respective leaders N. T. Rama Rao, Kanshi Ram, and Parkash Singh Badal. In September 2015, regional political party Shiv Sena demanded the award for the independence activist Vinayak Damodar Savarkar stating that he had been "deliberately neglected by previous governments" but his family clarified that they are not making such demand and that the freedom fighter is known for his contribution towards independence movement and did not need an award for recognition.

Per the original statutes, sportspersons were not eligible for the Bharat Ratna; however, a revision of the rules in December 2011 made eligible "any field of human endeavour". Subsequently, several sportspersons' names were discussed; among the most talked-about of these were field-hockey player Dhyan Chand and former world chess champion Viswanathan Anand. In 2011, 82 members of parliament recommended Chand's name for the award to the Prime Minister's Office. In January 2012, the Ministry of Youth Affairs and Sports forwarded his name again, this time along with 2008 Summer Olympics gold medallist shooter Abhinav Bindra and mountaineer Tenzing Norgay. Bindra had earlier been recommended for the award in May 2013 by the National Rifle Association of India. In July 2013, the ministry again recommended Dhyan Chand. However, in November 2013, cricketer Sachin Tendulkar became the first sports-person to receive the honour and this garnered much criticism for the government.

A PIL was filed in the Karnataka High Court where in the petitioner requested the court to issue a direction to the Ministry of Home Affairs to consider their representation dated 26 October 2012 and confer the Bharat Ratna upon Mahatma Gandhi. On 27 January 2014, a counsel appearing for the petitioner noted that after multiple representations from the petitioner, they were provided with the information under RTI that the recommendations to confer the award on Gandhi have been received multiple times in the past and were forwarded to the Prime Minister's Office. A Division bench comprising Chief Justice D.H. Waghela and Justice B.V. Nagarathna dismissed the petition stating that the subject is not amenable to any adjudication process and the nominations and conferment process is stated to be informal and in the discretion of the highest authority in the Government.

List of recipients

See also 

Padma Vibhushan
Padma Bhushan
Padma Shri
The Greatest Indian

Explanatory notes

Posthumous recipients

References

Bibliography

Further reading
 
 
 Sabharwal,D.P. Wing Commander (2008). Bharat Ratnas. Rupa Publications.

External links 
 
 भारत रत्न पुरस्कार विजेता व वर्ष Bharat Ratna Winner List Latest 2021

 
1954 establishments in India
Awards established in 1954
Civil awards and decorations of India
Lists of Indian award winners